Acraea safie is a butterfly in the family Nymphalidae. It is found in Ethiopia.

Description

A. safie Fldr. (57 b) is a small, very distinct species. Both wings densely scaled, black-brown above; the forewing with three white subapical spots in 4-6 and a yellow spot in 1 b and in 2, the hindwing with a narrow yellow median band, more or less broken up into spots; on the under surface the fore wing is black with sulphur-yellow marginal band striped with black and light discal spots as above; the ground-colour of the hindwing beneath is a lighter or darker yellowish, with or without indication of a median band; black basal dots reduced; marginal streaks fine, occasionally at the proximal end with punctiform thickening. Abyssinia.- f. antinorii Oberth. only differs in having the median band on the upperside of the hindwing absent or incomplete. Abyssinia.

Subspecies
Acraea safie safie (northern and central Ethiopia)
Acraea safie antinorii Oberthür, 1880 (western and southern Ethiopia)

Taxonomy
It is a member of the Acraea jodutta species group - but see also Pierre & Bernaud, 2014

References

External links

Die Gross-Schmetterlinge der Erde 13: Die Afrikanischen Tagfalter. Plate XIII 57 b

Butterflies described in 1865
safie
Endemic fauna of Ethiopia
Butterflies of Africa
Taxa named by Baron Cajetan von Felder
Taxa named by Rudolf Felder